Pernis  is a genus of birds in the raptor subfamily Perninae.  The genus name is derived from Ancient Greek pernes περνης, a term used by Aristotle for a bird of prey.

They breed in temperate and warmer climates of the Old World, and are specialist feeders on wasp larvae. The two temperate species, the European and crested honey buzzards, are migratory.

They breed in woodland, and are often inconspicuous except when displaying.

The members of this genus have plumage which mimics that of juvenile common buzzards or of Nisaetus hawk-eagles. It has been suggested that the similarity has arisen as a partial protection against predation by larger raptors such as goshawks, which may be wary about attacking what appears to be a better-protected species with stronger bill and talons than the honey buzzards actually possess.

Species
It consists of four medium-sized, broad-winged species.

Comparing sequences from a short subsection of the mitochondrial cytb gene, Gamulf and Haring found five clades: apivorus, steerei–winkleri, celebensis, philippensis–orientalis–ruficollis, and torquatus–ptilorhynchus–palawanensis. They proposed splitting the steerei–winkleri group from P. celebensis into a new species Pernis steerei, but felt that splitting Pernis ptilorhynchus would be "premature" given the lack of morphological differences.

Despite the name "crested honey buzzard", the subspecies P. p. orientalis, P. p. philippensis, and P. p. palawanensis all lack crests.

References
British Birds, volume 99, March 2006
Ferguson-Lees, Christie, Franklin, Mead and Burton Raptors of the World  
Gensbøl, Benny (1989). Collins guide to the Birds of Prey of Britain and Europe North Africa and the Middle East, William Collins Sons and Co Ltd.

Notes

 
Bird genera
Birds of prey of Eurasia
Taxa named by Georges Cuvier